The 116, formerly 116 Clique (pronounced one-one-six click), is an American Southern Christian hip hop collective originally from Dallas, Texas signed to the Atlanta-based Reach Records. The group performs a wide variety of contemporary hip hop styles, from chopped and screwed to trap to Latin hip hop. The 116 Clique is named after the Bible verse : "For I am not ashamed of the gospel: for it is the power of God unto salvation to every one that believes; to the Jew first, and also to the Gentile." For them it means acknowledging the power of the Gospel and the divine calling to proclaim it in every area of their life. "We can lay our lives down to serve and glorify God in everything we do."

History
The group debuted with The Compilation Album in 2005. DJ Primo remixed the original recordings the following year with The Compilation Album: Chopped and Screwed. The remix album included four bonus tracks. In 2007 they released 13 Letters, the album name representing the 13 letters Paul wrote to first-century Christians. In 2011 they released the Man Up compilation album. Man Up was intended for release on July 23, 2011. However, the official release date was pushed back to September 27, 2011. A corresponding film, directed by former member Sho Baraka, was made to show the importance of a godly man. The Man Up Movie & Concert Series tour took place in selected cities where fans could see a screening of Man Up followed by a concert with songs from the soundtrack. They released a single, "Come Alive", based on their 2012 Unashamed Tour. in 2013, the clique released "Now They Know", based on the Unashamed Tour V. On November 23, 2018, a digital Christmas album was released, entitled The Gift: A Christmas Compilation, and made available through most major streaming services. A playlist of some 14 songs, entitled "Summer 19" was released on July 19, 2019 by Reach under the auspices of the group. On October 23, 2020, 116 released Sin Vergüenza, a collaboration between Reach and No Apologies Music which features a combination of American hip hop and Latin urbano artists. All two dozen tracks were released as singles.

Discography 

 The Compilation Album (2005)
 The Compilation Album: Chopped and Screwed (2006)
 13 Letters (2007)
 Man Up (2011)
 116 Summer Eighteen (2018)
 The Gift: A Christmas Compilation (2018)
 116 Summer Nineteen (2019)
 116 Summer Twenty (2020)
 Sin Vergüenza (2020)
 116 Summer Twenty-One (2021)
 116 Summer Twenty-Two (2022)

Tours

In 2008, Lecrae, Trip Lee, Sho Baraka and Tedashii went on the Unashamed Tour. In 2010, Lecrae, Tedashii, Trip Lee, Sho Baraka, PRo and DJ Official went on the Unashamed Tour 2010. Lecrae was on the 2011 Mission Cruise (Cruise with a Cause) on May 30 – June 4, 2011.

 Unashamed (Summer 2008) Lecrae, Tedashii, Trip Lee, Sho Baraka
 Don't Waste Your Life Tour (Summer 2009) Lecrae, Tedashii, Trip Lee, Sho Baraka, with special guest Flame.
 Unashamed 2010: The Movement (Fall 2010) Lecrae, PRo, Tedashii, Trip Lee, Sho Baraka, DJ Official
 Man Up: Movie & Concert Series (Fall 2011) Lecrae, PRo, Tedashii, KB, Sho Baraka, Trip Lee and Andy Mineo
 Unashamed Tour 2012: Come Alive (Fall 2012) Lecrae, Trip Lee, Tedashii, Derek Minor (formerly known as PRo), KB, Andy Mineo, with special guests Propaganda and Thi'sl
 Unashamed Tour V (Fall 2013) Lecrae, Tedashii, Derek Minor, KB, and Andy Mineo with special guest Swoope
 Unashamed Forever Tour (Spring 2019) Lecrae, Tedashii, Trip Lee, KB, Andy Mineo, GAWVI, 1K Phew and WHATUPRG
 We Are Unashamed Tour (Spring 2022) Lecrae, Tedashii, 1K Phew, Andy Mineo, Wande, WHATUPRG, Trip Lee and Hulvey.

References

External links
Official myspace page
 AllMusic biography

American hip hop groups
Christian hip hop groups
Musical groups established in 2005
2005 establishments in Texas
Musical groups from Dallas
Reach Records artists
American Christian musical groups